David Richard Gooderson (born 24 February 1941) is a British Indian-born English actor who has appeared in several television roles.

Career 
As well as portraying Davros, creator of the Daleks in the Doctor Who serial Destiny of the Daleks, he appeared in episodes of Lovejoy, Mapp & Lucia and A Touch of Frost. Gooderson was also featured on many radio programmes for the BBC, including The Next Programme Follows Almost Immediately with Bill Wallis, David Jason, Denise Coffey and Jonathan Cecil and Huddwinks with Roy Hudd and others. He wrote several plays for stage and radio broadcast, and published several books about Kenneth Grahame.

Gooderson was a member of the Cambridge Footlights, and featured in the cast of the 1964 Footlights revue, Stuff What Dreams Are Made Of.

Filmography

Film

Television

References

External links

David Gooderson's website (professional experience and plays written)
BBC Radio Plays involving David Gooderson

1941 births
Living people
English male television actors
People from Lahore